Riding High (also known as Melody Inn) is a 1943 American comedy film starring Dorothy Lamour and Dick Powell, made in Technicolor, and released by Paramount Pictures. It was nominated for the Academy Award for Sound Recording (Loren L. Ryder).

Plot
A city girl goes out West to star in a nightclub act and meets a gold prospector.

Cast

References

External links
 
 
 
 

1943 films
Paramount Pictures films
Films directed by George Marshall
Films scored by Victor Young
1943 musical comedy films
American musical comedy films
1940s English-language films
1940s American films